Ore is a term for mineral deposits.

Ore may also refer to:

Arts and entertainment
 Le Ore, an Italian magazine
 One-Roll Engine, a role-playing game system
 Ordo Rosarius Equilibrio, a Swedish music group

Places

Norway
 Ore, Farsund, a village in Vest-Agder county
 Øre, Norway, a village and former municipality in Møre og Romsdal county
 Øre (lake), a lake in Åseral municipality, Vest-Agder county

United Kingdom
 Ore, East Sussex, a district in Hastings, East Sussex, England
 River Ore, a river in Suffolk, England
 River Ore, Fife, a river in Fife, Scotland
 Ore, Fife, a district near Kirkcaldy, Scotland

United States
 Oregon, a western state abbreviated Ore.

Elsewhere
 Ore, Haute-Garonne, a French commune
 Ore, Nigeria, a town in the Ondo region

Other uses
 Öre, a Swedish coin and currency unit
 Øre, a Danish/Norwegian coin and currency unit
 Ore (pronoun) (俺), a Japanese form of me
 Operation Ore, a British police operation targeting child pornography
 Object Reuse and Exchange, an Internet standard
 Orange Municipal Airport, by FAA LID airport code
 Orthographic Reform of English (OR-E), an English-language spelling reform

People with the surname, Ore 
 Henrik Øre (born 1979), former Danish cricketer
 Øystein Ore, Norwegian mathematician
 Rebecca Ore, American science fiction writer

People with the given name, Ore
 Ore Oduba, (born 1986), British journalist

See also
 Oare (disambiguation)
 Or (disambiguation)
 OAR (disambiguation)